The Malik-E-Maidan also Malik-i-Maidan (Master of the Field) or (Master of the Battlefield), is a large early 16th century cannon, located at Burj-E-Sherz (Lion tower), Bijapur Fort, Bijapur, India.

History
The cannon was cast in 1549 by a Turkish engineer Muhammad Bin Husain Rumi, then serving Sultan Burhan Nizam Shah I of Ahmednagar. The Sultan presented the Cannon to his Son-in-Law, Sultan Ali Adil Shah I of Bijapur. 

In 1565 AD the cannon was used in the Battle of Talikota by the Bijapur Sultan Ali Adil Shah I, attacking Aliya Rama Raya of the Vijayanagara Empire as part of the combined Deccan Sultanates force. After the victory of the Deccan Sultanates the cannon was named "Malik-i-Maidan".  At some point in the next 59 years, control of the cannon was transferred from the Bijapur Sultanate to the Ahmadnagar Sultanate.
 
In 1624 AD, Prime Minister Malik Amber of the Ahmadnagar Sultanate transported the Malik–i-Maidan with the help of trained war elephants from Daulatabad Fort south to Sholapur, as part of his invasion of the Bijapur Sultanate.  He would later transport the cannon north again, as he retreated after unsuccessfully besieging of the city of Bijapur, and subsequently used it in the Battle of Bhatvadi against the Mughals and Bijapur Sultanate.

The cannon, among world's largest in its category, was attempted to be shifted to Great Britain by the East India Company as a war trophy, but due to its huge size and un-conditioned transport infrastructure the cannon could not be transported.

Structure

Decoration and Inscriptions
The cannon's muzzle is decorated with a low relief of the head of a lion with its jaws open, swallowing an elephant.

Three inscriptions can be found on the cannon, of which two were inscribed during Burhan Nizam Shah I of Ahmednagar as per the inscriptions. It was cast at Ahmadnagar from bell metal by Muhammad Bin Husain Rumi in 1549. The third inscription was added by Aurangzeb when he conquered Bijapur in 1685–86.

See also
 List of the largest cannon by caliber
 Tsar Cannon

References

Tourist attractions in Bijapur district
Individual cannons
Buildings and structures in Bijapur district